Montiijo can refer to:

Places
Panama
 Montijo, Panama populated place in Veraguas Province
 Montijo District, a district in Veraguas Province
Portugal
 Montijo, Portugal, a municipality in the district of Setúbal
 Montijo (parish), a civil parish in the municipality of Montijo

Spain
 Montijo, Spain
 Battle of Montijo, 1644 battle between Spain and Portugal

See also
 Eugénie de Montijo, wife of Napoleon III